Gordana "Goca" Božinovska (born 16 January 1965) is a Serbian pop-folk singer. Born in the village of Samaila near Kraljevo, she started her career by performing in kafanas dodging Ibar Highway alongside Vesna Zmijanac. Božinovska eventually rose to prominence after being discovered by singer Šaban Šaulić.

In 2013, she was a contestant on the reality show Farma, finishing in fourth place.

Božinovska was married to kick-boxer and alleged leader of Surčin Clan, Zoran Šijan, who was assassinated in 1999 under unresolved circumstances. She has three children.

Discography
Studio albums
Ti mi beše od zlata jabuka (1984)
Ne idi (1987)
Želim da me želiš (1989)
Još sam jaka (1997)
Okovi (1999)
Goca Božinovska (2000)
Goca Božinovska (2003)
Goca Božinovska (2005)

See also
 Music of Serbia
 List of singers from Serbia
 Turbo-folk

References

External links
 

1965 births
Living people
21st-century Serbian women singers
Serbian turbo-folk singers
Grand Production artists
20th-century Serbian women singers